The 1994 Australian Football League (AFL) season was the 98th season of the VFL/AFL. The season saw 92 Australian rules footballers make their senior AFL debut and a further 50 players transfer to new clubs having previously played in the AFL.

Summary

Debuts

References

Australian rules football records and statistics
Australian rules football-related lists
1994 in Australian rules football